Ákos Eleőd (born 28 October 1961, in Budapest) is a Hungarian architect responsible for designing Statue Park.

References

Additional Sources
 Ki kicsoda, 2006. MTI, Budapest, 2005.

External links

See also 
 List of Hungarian architects

Hungarian architects
Living people
1961 births